These are the highest-grossing, primarily non-English language films in the world. The vast majority of them are Chinese films.

Film and language 
In terms of gross revenue, English-language films are vastly over-represented among the highest-grossing films of all time. Among the top 100 highest-grossing films, 97 of them are in English, with the other three being the Chinese films  The Battle at Lake Changjin, Wolf Warrior 2 and Hi, Mom. The primary source of the highest-grossing films are the major film studios based in and around Hollywood, California. As a result, nearly all of these films are English-language films as the United States is primarily an English-speaking country.

One factor behind the relative financial success of English-language films is that the English language is widely considered to be a universal language—it is the first language of 400 million people, the second language of another 400 million, and a foreign language of an additional 700 million. It is thus understood by 1.5 billion people, which is almost 20% of the world population. The Chinese language, especially the standard variant, has over twice as many native speakers as English, but much fewer foreign-language speakers.

Another major factor is the difference in cinema box office ticket prices around the world, with developing countries and newly industrialized countries having lower ticket prices than developed countries, due to lower currency value, less average income and lower living costs. A number of Chinese, Indian and Soviet films sold more than  tickets at the box office, but at relatively low ticket prices compared to Hollywood films, thus limiting the amount of gross revenue generated. Up until the 1990s, US and UK ticket prices were significantly greater than Chinese, Indian and Soviet ticket prices.

The world's largest markets in terms of box office admissions are China, India and the United States. The former Soviet Union (before it dissolved in 1991) was a similarly large box office market, with relatively lower ticket prices than North America due to lower living costs. Indian films had a large overseas audience in the Soviet Union between the 1950s and 1980s, and were significantly more popular than Hollywood films there.

Highest-grossing films by box office revenue

Box office admissions 

A number of non-English markets have traditionally given box office figures in ticket sales (such as France, South Korea and the Soviet Union), rather than gross revenue, thus only ticket sales numbers are available for a number of older non-English films in various markets. This list varies from revenue-based rankings due to the huge difference in the price of admission tickets from place to place as well as from one moment in time to another.

The following table lists known estimated box office ticket sales for various high-grossing non-English films that have sold over  tickets worldwide.

Note: Some of the data are incomplete due to a lack of available admissions data from a number of countries. Therefore, it is not an exhaustive list of all the highest-grossing non-English films by ticket sales, so no rankings are given.

Home video sales revenue

The following table lists known home video sales for various high-grossing non-English films. Note that this list is incomplete and is thus not necessarily representative of the highest-grossing non-English films by video sales, therefore no rankings are given.

Highest-grossing openings

The following is a list of the highest-grossing openings for non-English films. Since films do not open on Fridays in many markets, the 'opening' is taken to be the gross between the first day of release and the first Sunday following the film's release. Only films that have to an opening above  qualify for the list.

Highest-grossing films by year

(...) Since grosses are not limited to original theatrical runs, a film's first-run gross is included in brackets after the total if known.

Timeline of highest-grossing films

Box office revenue

Box office admissions

Openings  
The following is a timeline of the highest-grossing openings for non-English films. Since films do not open on Fridays in many markets, the 'opening' is taken to be the gross between the first day of release and the first Sunday following the film's release.

Highest-grossing films by language

Box office revenue 
The following is a list of highest-grossing films by language.

Box office admissions 
The following is a list of highest box office admissions by language.

Openings  
The following is a list of highest-grossing openings by language. Since films do not open on Fridays in many markets, the 'opening' is taken to be the gross between the first day of release and the first Sunday following the film's release.

Highest-grossing film franchises and film series
The following is the Highest-grossing non-English film franchises and film series.

See also 
 List of highest-grossing films
 List of highest-grossing media franchises
 List of most expensive non-English-language films
 Lists of highest-grossing films
 World cinema

Notes

Footnotes

References

Sources
 

Lists of highest-grossing films
Lists of films by language